Ben Currie (born 15 July 1994) is an English professional rugby league footballer who plays as a  or  for the Warrington Wolves in the Super League. He has played for the England Knights, Ireland& England at international level.

Currie has spent time on loan from Warrington at the Swinton Lions in the Championship.

Background
Currie was born in Lowton, Greater Manchester, England.

Club career
Currie played his junior rugby at Golborne Parkside before signing with the Warrington Wolves. He made his début for Warrington in April 2012, aged 17, in a 46–12 victory over the Widnes Vikings. He scored his first senior try a month later against Salford City Reds.

In 2013, he played one game for Swinton Lions on a dual-registration deal, scoring two tries against the Sheffield Eagles. He made two further appearances for Swinton in 2014, scoring a hat trick against Barrow Raiders.

In June 2015, Currie signed a new four-year contract with Warrington.

He played in the 2016 Challenge Cup Final defeat by Hull F.C. at Wembley Stadium.

In September 2016, Currie suffered a torn anterior cruciate ligament, ruling him out for most of the 2017 season. Despite the injury, he was named in the 2016 Super League Dream Team for his performances during the season, and was rewarded with a new contract at Warrington, keeping him at the club until 2020.

He returned to action in July 2017, but suffered another injury to the same knee in his second game after returning to the side. He was able to recover before the end of the season, playing two games for Warrington in the 2017 Qualifiers.

He played in the 2019 Challenge Cup Final victory over St Helens at Wembley Stadium.

International career
Currie made his international début for Ireland in the 2013 Rugby League World Cup, and played in all three of their group games.

In 2015 Currie was selected by Steve McNamara to represent England through his father, for their test series against New Zealand but did not make an appearance.

In 2017, he was one of two uncapped players to be named in England's World Cup squad. He made his début for England in the opening game against Australia as a substitute after being named in the team as a late replacement for Alex Walmsley, who was ruled out due to illness.

References

External links
Warrington Wolves profile
SL profile
(archived by web.archive.org) Statistics at rlwc2017.com

1994 births
Living people
England Knights national rugby league team players
England national rugby league team players
English people of Irish descent
English rugby league players
Ireland national rugby league team players
People from Lowton
Rugby league players from Wigan
Rugby league second-rows
Swinton Lions players
Warrington Wolves players